Patrice Pamphile Tardif (born October 30, 1970) is a former professional ice hockey centre who played for the National Hockey League's St. Louis Blues and Los Angeles Kings.

Biography
Tardif was born in Thetford Mines, Quebec. As a youth, he played in the 1982 and 1983 Quebec International Pee-Wee Hockey Tournaments with a minor ice hockey team from Thetford Mines.

Making his debut with the St. Louis Blues, he was traded along with Roman Vopat, Craig Johnson, and draft picks to the Los Angeles Kings in 1996 for Wayne Gretzky. He is now a star forward for the Thetford Mines Assurancia of the Ligue Nord-Américaine de Hockey.

Tardif's grandfather was former Union Nationale minister Patrice Tardif.

Awards and honors

References

External links

1970 births
Bolzano HC players
Canadian ice hockey centres
Detroit Vipers players
Sportspeople from Thetford Mines
Kassel Huskies players
Living people
Los Angeles Kings players
Maine Black Bears men's ice hockey players
Manitoba Moose (IHL) players
Peoria Rivermen (IHL) players
Phoenix Roadrunners (IHL) players
Quebec Citadelles players
Rochester Americans players
St. Louis Blues draft picks
St. Louis Blues players
Worcester IceCats players
Ice hockey people from Quebec
Canadian expatriate ice hockey players in Italy
Canadian expatriate ice hockey players in Germany
NCAA men's ice hockey national champions